Darragh Fitzgibbon (born 1 April 1997) is an Irish hurler who plays as a midfielder for club side Charleville, divisional side Avondhu, university side University College Cork and at inter-county level with the Cork senior hurling team.

Playing career

CBS Charleville

Fitzgibbon first came to prominence as a hurler with C.B.S. Charleville. Having played hurling in every grade during his time at the school, he usually lined out in the forwards on the senior team in the Harty Cup.

University College Cork

On 23 February 2019, Fitzgibbon lined out at left corner-forward for University College Cork when they faced Mary Immaculate College in the Fitzgibbon Cup final. He scored a point from play in the 2-21 to 0-13 victory.

Fitzgibbon played in a second successive Fitzgibbon Cup final on 12 February 2020. Lining out at midfield, he ended the game with a second successive winners' medal after scoring two points from play in the 0-18 to 2-11 defeat of the Institute of Technology, Carlow.

Charleville

Fitzgibbon joined the Charleville club at a young age and played in all grades at juvenile and underage levels. On 7 June 2014, he made his adult debut in a 0-20 to 0-14 defeat of Milford in the intermediate championship. Charleville subsequently reached the final, however, they lost to Fermoy by a single point. Charleville qualified for a second successive final in 2015, with Fitzgibbon scoring 1-09 and claiming a winners' medal in a 5-24 to 1-10 defeat of Dripsey.

After three years in the Premier Intermediate Championship, Charleville qualified for the 2018 final against Courcey Rovers. After an initial draw, Fitzgibbon collected a winners' medal in this grade after a 0-15 to 0-14 win in the replay.

Cork

Minor and under-21

Fitzgibbon first played for Cork at minor level in 2015, however, his sole season in the grade ended without success with a defeat by Limerick. On 23 June 2016, Fitzgibbon made his first appearance for the Cork under-21 hurling team in a seven-point defeat by Limerick. He also played in Cork's unsuccessful championship campaign in 2017. On 4 July 2018, Fitzgibbon won a Munster medal after leaving the field injured in Cork's 2-23 to 1-13 defeat of Tipperary in the final. On 26 August 2018, he scored a point in Cork's 3-13 to 1-16 All-Ireland final defeat by Tipperary in what was his last game in the grade. Fitzgibbon was later nominated for the Team of the Year.

Senior

Fitzgibbon made his senior debut for Cork on 11 February 2017 in a National League defeat of Clare, before making his first championship start later that season in a Munster Championship quarter-final against Tipperary. Fitzgibbon was a regular starter for Cork's subsequent championship games. On 9 July 2017, he won his first Munster medal following a 1-25 to 1-20 defeat of Clare in the final.

On 1 July 2018, Fitzgibbon won a second successive Munster medal following a 2-24 to 3-19 defeat of Clare in the final. At the end of the championship he was named on The Sunday Game Team of the Year. Fitzgibbon ended the season by winning an All-Star Award while he was also a Young Hurler of the Year nominee.

Career statistics

Club

Division

Inter-county

Honours

University College Cork
Fitzgibbon Cup (2): 2019, 2020

Charleville
Cork Senior A Hurling Championship (1): 2020
Munster Intermediate Club Hurling Championship (1): 2018
Cork Premier Intermediate Hurling Championship (1): 2018
Cork Intermediate Hurling Championship (1): 2015
Cork Under-21 B Football Championship (1)  2018
 North Cork Under-21 Hurling Championship (2) 2016, 2017

Cork
Munster Senior Hurling Championship (2): 2017, 2018
Munster Under-21 Hurling Championship (1): 2018

Awards
GAA GPA All Stars Awards (1): 2018
The Sunday Game Team of the Year (1): 2018

References

External link

Darragh Fitzgibbon profile at the Cork GAA website

1997 births
Living people
Charleville hurlers
Avondhu hurlers
UCC hurlers
Cork inter-county hurlers